Titanium trisulfide (TiS3) is an inorganic chemical compound of titanium and sulfur. Its formula unit contains one Ti4+ cation, one S2− anion and one S22−.

TiS3 has a layered crystal structure, where the layers are weakly bonded to each other and can be exfoliated with an adhesive tape. The exfoliated layers have potential applications in ultrathin field-effect transistors.

Synthesis
Millimeter-long crystalline whiskers of TiS3 can be grown by chemical vapor transport at ca. 500 °C, using excess sulfur as the transporting gas.

Properties

TiS3 is an n-type semiconductor with an indirect bandgap of about 1 eV. Its individual layers are made of TiS atomic chains; hence they are anisotropic and their properties depend on the in-plane orientation. For example, in the same sample, electron mobility can be 80 cm2/(V·s) along the b-axis and 40 cm2/(V·s) along the a-axis.

References

Sulfides
Titanium(IV) compounds
Monolayers